Kálmán Katona (8 April 1948 – 5 February 2017) was a Hungarian politician as a member of Parliament and President of the Electorate of the Hungarian Democratic Forum (MDF) conservative party.

He served as Vice-President of the Committee for Economy of the Hungarian Parliament between 1990 and 1994, and as Minister of Transport, Communications and Water Management in the cabinet of Viktor Orbán between July 1998 and May 2000. He was the Hungarian Democratic Forum candidate for Mayor of Budapest in 2006. He was married since 1973 and had three children.

He died on 5 February 2017, aged 69.

References

1948 births
2017 deaths
Government ministers of Hungary
Hungarian Democratic Forum politicians
Members of the National Assembly of Hungary (1990–1994)
Members of the National Assembly of Hungary (2006–2010)
People from Pécs